"Now I'm Here" is a song by the British rock band Queen. Written by lead guitarist Brian May, it was the sixth song on their third album, Sheer Heart Attack (1974). The song is noted for its hard riff and vocal harmonies. In the UK, the song reached #11 on the charts when released as a single in 1975. The song was a live favourite, performed at virtually every concert from late 1974 to 1986.

Details 

The song draws on May's fond experiences of the band's US tour earlier in 1974. Mott the Hoople, whom Queen was supporting, are referenced in the line: Down in the city, just Hoople and me.

It also appeared on the 1981 compilation album Greatest Hits and the 1997 compilation album Queen Rocks. In March 2005, Q magazine placed "Now I'm Here" at number 33 in its list of the 100 Greatest Guitar Tracks.

Live performances 

"Now I'm Here" was a fixture of Queen's set lists, being performed on every concert tour from 1974 until the band's final tour in 1986. It was first performed on the Sheer Heart Attack Tour in Manchester on 30 October 1974.

On the Sheer Heart Attack Tour, Mercury would be seen singing the line "Now I'm here" on one side of the stage amidst the darkness and dry ice, and a few bars later, at "Now I'm there," he would "appear" on the other side of the stage, an illusion created by an identically-dressed stagehand.

The liner notes of Live Killers (1979), Queen's first live album, say that the song was dropped from the setlist for some time, but had recently been reintroduced. The song was rearranged to allow Mercury to interact with the audience in a "call and response" sing along. It is unclear when the song was dropped and for how long.

May continued to perform the song as a solo artist following Mercury's death in 1991. At The Freddie Mercury Tribute Concert in 1992, May joined Def Leppard on stage to perform the song, which went on to become the B-side to Def Leppard's single "Tonight" and would also make it onto the deluxe edition of their Adrenalize album. It was used as the opening song on the American, Asian and Australian legs of the Queen + Adam Lambert Tour 2014–2015.

Charts

Certifications

Personnel 
Freddie Mercury - lead and backing vocals, Hammond organ
Brian May - electric guitar, piano, backing vocals
Roger Taylor - drums, percussion, backing vocals
John Deacon - bass guitar

Live recordings 
Live Killers (1979)
Concerts for the People of Kampuchea (1979) (recorded at their Christmas concert in Hammersmith Odeon, London)
Queen Rock Montreal (1981)
Queen on Fire - Live at the Bowl (1982)
Live at Wembley '86 / Live at Wembley Stadium (1986)
Hungarian Rhapsody: Queen Live in Budapest ’86 (1986)
The Freddie Mercury Tribute Concert (1992) (played by Def Leppard and Brian May)
Live at the Brixton Academy (Brian May album) (1993)
Live at the Rainbow '74 (2014)
A Night at the Odeon – Hammersmith 1975 (2015)

References

External links
 Official YouTube videos: original music video, Live at the Bowl (and reprise), Live at the Bowl: "Dragon Attack"/"Now I'm Here" (reprise)
 Lyrics at Queen official website

Queen (band) songs
1975 singles
Songs written by Brian May
Music videos directed by Bruce Gowers
Song recordings produced by Roy Thomas Baker
Songs about New York (state)
EMI Records singles
Elektra Records singles
Hollywood Records singles
1974 songs
British hard rock songs